These are the matches that Napoli have played in European football competitions. In UEFA European football, Napoli has won the 1988–89 UEFA Cup.

Forward Dries Mertens is the club's record goalscorer in European competitions with 28 goals. Midfielder Marek Hamšík has made the most European appearances with 80.

UEFA-organised seasonal competitions 
Napoli's score listed first.

European Cup / UEFA Champions League

European Cup Winners' Cup

UEFA Cup / UEFA Europa League

UEFA Intertoto Cup

FIFA-only recognized seasonal competitions

Inter-Cities Fairs Cup

Overall record

By competition 

Source: UEFA.comPld = Matches played; W = Matches won; D = Matches drawn; L = Matches lost; GF = Goals for; GA = Goals against; GD = Goal Difference.

By team 

Key

References

External links

 
 S.S.C. Napoli at Serie A 
 S.S.C. Napoli at UEFA
 S.S.C. Napoli at FIFA

European
N